Ted Hamilton was an American Negro league pitcher in the 1920s.

Hamilton made his Negro leagues debut in 1921 with the Cleveland Tate Stars, and played for the Cleveland Browns and St. Louis Stars in 1924. In his 14 recorded games on the mound, he posted a 4.72 ERA over 76.1 innings.

References

External links
 and Seamheads

Year of birth missing
Year of death missing
Place of birth missing
Place of death missing
Cleveland Browns (baseball) players
Cleveland Tate Stars players
St. Louis Stars (baseball) players
Baseball pitchers